Ronald Lewis Brinton (26 February 1903 – 19 April 1980) was an English cricketer whose first-class cricket career comprised two matches for Worcestershire in June 1922. Worcestershire lost both games inside two days, and Brinton made no score of note in either.

Brinton was born in Kidderminster, Worcestershire; he died at the age of 77 in Malvern.

External links
 
 Statistical summary from CricketArchive

1903 births
1980 deaths
English cricketers
Worcestershire cricketers
Sportspeople from Kidderminster